Pelly Ruddock Mpanzu (born 22 March 1994) is a professional footballer who plays as a midfielder for  club Luton Town. Born in England, he represents the DR Congo national team.

Career

Early career
Born in Hendon, Greater London, Mpanzu began his career with the youth system at Boreham Wood and made 13 first-team appearances.

West Ham United
Mpanzu signed a two-and-a-half-year professional contract with Championship club West Ham United on 5 December 2011 after a successful trial. He was a member of the West Ham team which won the Ciutat de Barcelona Trophy against Espanyol in September 2013. Mpanzu made his first-team debut in a 2–0 win away to Burnley in the League Cup fourth round on 29 October 2013. West Ham manager Sam Allardyce said of his debut, "This was their big chance. Three players, all defenders, Pelly Ruddock Mpanzu, Dan Potts and Leo Chambers, can feel very proud of themselves, what they've done."

Luton Town
On 28 November 2013, Mpanzu signed for Conference Premier club Luton Town on loan until 4 January 2014. He made his Luton debut in central defence two days later in a 0–0 draw with Staines Town in the FA Trophy, and was named man of the match in the replay, which Luton won 2–0, while playing in central midfield. He played in central midfield for five further matches, all victories, before being recalled back to West Ham's squad on 30 December due to his parent club's injury crisis. After impressing in his seven matches for Luton, manager John Still revealed that he was looking to bring Mpanzu back to Kenilworth Road. On 28 January 2014, Mpanzu signed for Luton permanently on a two-and-a-half-year contract for an undisclosed fee, in a transfer described as a "major coup". He scored his first goal for the club in a 7–0 win over Hereford United on 15 February 2014, before scoring his second two months later, a "scorching half-volley" in a 2–1 away win over Dartford. He finished 2013–14 with 24 appearances and two goals, as Luton won the Conference Premier title and promotion to League Two. Mpanzu said that his decision to leave West Ham and drop down the divisions had been "the right choice" as he had a winners' medal to justify it.

Mpanzu suffered numerous injuries, including a rare calcification of the hamstring muscle, over the course of 2014–15 and made 18 appearances, of which only 10 were in the starting lineup. He scored one goal during the campaign; an injury-time equaliser in a 1–1 draw with Bury.

He remained fit for most of the 2016–17 season, playing in 52 games in all competitions including both legs of the play-off semi-final, which Luton lost 6–5 on aggregate to Blackpool. Mpanzu signed a new three-year contract with Luton on 3 August 2017, with the option of a further year.

Style of play
Mpanzu has been described as a "powerful" box-to-box midfielder with "endless energy". Mpanzu has stated that central midfield is his natural position, but that he is able to play as a centre-back.

International career
Born in England, Mpanzu is of Congolese descent. He was called up to represent the DR Congo national team for a pair of friendlies in June 2021. He debuted with the DR Congo in a 1–0 friendly loss to Tunisia on 5 June 2021.

Personal life
His cousin Peter Kioso is also a footballer; the two played together at Luton Town.

Career statistics

Honours
Luton Town
EFL League One: 2018–19
EFL League Two runner-up: 2017–18
Conference Premier: 2013–14

Individual
Luton Town Player of the Season: 2019–20

References

External links
Profile at the Luton Town F.C. website

1994 births
Living people
Footballers from Hendon
Democratic Republic of the Congo footballers
Democratic Republic of the Congo international footballers
English footballers
English sportspeople of Democratic Republic of the Congo descent
Association football midfielders
Boreham Wood F.C. players
West Ham United F.C. players
Luton Town F.C. players
National League (English football) players
English Football League players
Black British sportspeople